Oecomys rutilus, also known as the reddish oecomys or red arboreal rice rat, is a species of rodent in the genus Oecomys of family Cricetidae. It is found in Guyana, Suriname, French Guiana, and nearby regions of Brazil and Venezuela.

References

Literature cited
Catzeflis, F. and Weksler, M. 2008. . In IUCN. IUCN Red List of Threatened Species. Version 2009.2. <www.iucnredlist.org>. Downloaded on December 2, 2009.
Musser, G.G. and Carleton, M.D. 2005. Superfamily Muroidea. Pp. 894–1531 in Wilson, D.E. and Reeder, D.M. (eds.). Mammal Species of the World: a taxonomic and geographic reference. 3rd ed. Baltimore: The Johns Hopkins University Press, 2 vols., 2142 pp. 

Oecomys
Mammals described in 1921
Taxonomy articles created by Polbot